Steven Jon Hambleton (born 14 January 1961) is a Queensland GP and former federal president of the Australian Medical Association.

Early life

Education
Steve Hambleton attended St Joseph's College, Gregory Terrace from 1969 to 1978. Hambleton studied a Bachelor of Medicine, Bachelor of Surgery at the University of Queensland from 1979 to 1984.

Professional career

Australian Medical Association Federal Presidency
Hambleton served as president of the Australian Medical Association for three years from his unopposed election in June 2011 to May 2014.

AMAQ Foundation
Hambleton is the Foundation President of the AMAQ Foundation, the charity arm of the AMAQ.

References

Living people
1961 births
Australian general practitioners
Presidents of the Australian Medical Association